Noite Vem, Noite Vai (Portuguese for "Night Comes, Night Goes") is the third studio album by the Brazilian rock band TNT, released in 1991 through RCA Records. It was the band's final album to come out through RCA, their final release prior to their break-up three years later, their first one without original drummer Felipe Jotz (who was replaced by Paulo Arcari) and their only one with keyboardist João Maldonado.

In Noite Vem, Noite Vai, TNT abandoned the rockabilly-inflected sonority of their previous releases, heading towards a more traditional pop rock direction with more introspective and "mature" lyrics. This new musical direction heavily alienated former fans, and thus the album was not very well received at the time of its release.

TNT reunited in 2003 and released a fourth and final album, Um por Todos ou Todos por Um, in 2005, before breaking up again in 2007.

Track listing

Personnel
 Charles Master – vocals, bass guitar
 Márcio Petracco – electric guitar
 Luís Henrique "Tchê" Gomes – electric guitar
 Paulo Arcari – drums
 João Maldonado – keyboards
 Reinaldo B. Brito – production
 Miguel Plopschi – art direction

References

1991 albums
TNT (Brazilian band) albums
RCA Records albums